Messaging Architects (MA) is a Canadian software company specializing in e-mail products. Their flagship product is Netmail, an integrated email management platform.

History
Launched in March 1995 as ChronoFAX, the company was a distributor of computer-based fax software. ChronoFAX became Tobit Software North America as result of a partnership with a German company called Tobit that produced fax software for the Novell NetWare and GroupWise markets. When the three-and-a-half-year partnership with Tobit ended, the company again renamed itself, as Messaging Architects.

Messaging Architects initially provided add-ons for the Novell GroupWise messaging platform. Now the company offers an integrated email management platform called Netmail. Netmail consolidates the company's portfolio of email software and includes: Netmail Secure (formerly GWGuardian and M+Guardian), Netmail Archive (formerly M+Archive), Netmail Search, Netmail Migrate (formerly Migrator), and Netmail Store (formerly M+SecureStore). The company also provides email platform migration services. Messaging Architects has Professional Services Team with full Novell and Microsoft Exchange certification. Messaging Architects works with messaging platform providers to provide solutions for Microsoft Exchange, Novell GroupWise, and Lotus Notes.

From late 2008 Mark Crispin, inventor of IMAP, worked at Messaging Architects as a Senior Software Engineer, developing an entirely new IMAP server based upon a distributed mail store, and extending the MIX format.

Industry recognition
Messaging Architects' email security and email archiving software has been positioned in the Gartner Magic Quadrant reports. In 2009, M+Archive was positioned in the Magic Quadrant for Email Active Archiving.

In 2009, M+Guardian was the only email security system to achieve one Gold and two VBSpam Platinum Awards in Virus Bulletin's anti-spam certification.

Services
Messaging Architects also offers a range of remote and on-site services for managing email risk and the co-existence of different email platforms, including professional services, email migration services, email consulting, and email policy training.

References

Companies based in Montreal
Telecommunications companies established in 1995
Software companies of Canada
Computer security software companies
Spam filtering